Sega International Victory Goal is a 1995 soccer video game developed by Team Aquila and published by Sega for the Sega Saturn.

Gameplay
International Victory Goal features the ability to change the camera angle to three different angles.

Reception
Next Generation reviewed the Saturn version of the game, rating it three stars out of five, and stated that "In the early development days of the Saturn there will surely be some near misses in game design. Worldwide Soccer is a fairly good near miss, but a near miss nonetheless."

In 1996, Next Generation listed Worldwide Soccer 2 as number 47 on their "Top 100 Games of All Time", commenting that, "Worldwide Soccer II is so good that is makes soccer fans of those who previously detested the world's most popular sport."

Reviews
GamePro (Aug, 1995)
Electronic Gaming Monthly (Jul, 1995)
Hobby Consolas - Aug, 1995
Power Unlimited - Jul, 1995
Video Games & Computer Entertainment - Jul, 1995
Mean Machines - Sep, 1995

References

1995 video games
Association football video games
Sega video games
Sega Saturn games
Sega Saturn-only games
Video games developed in Japan